Parauxa is a genus of beetles in the family Cerambycidae, containing the following species:

 Parauxa alluaudi (Fairmaire, 1895)
 Parauxa nitida Breuning, 1966
 Parauxa puncticollis Breuning, 1980
 Parauxa rufoantennata Breuning, 1966
 Parauxa strandiella Breuning, 1942
 Parauxa striolata (Fairmaire, 1896)
 Parauxa tenuis (Fairmaire, 1901)

References

Apomecynini